The 30th Hanteo Music Awards ceremony is currently held at Jamsil Arena in Seoul on February 10–11, 2023, to recognise the best artists and recordings, primarily based on Hanteo Chart of the year from January 1 to December 31, 2022. The ceremony is hosted by Eugene, Shin Dong-yup, Hyunsuk and Baekseung.

It was broadcast live on SBS M and Mnet Japan. It is also available on online platforms Mnet Smart+ and Idolplus.

This is also the first offline awards ceremony in celebration of Hanteo Chart's 30th anniversary.

Criteria 
All songs and albums that are eligible to be nominated must be released from January to December 2022.

Winners and nominees 
Winners and nominees are listed in alphabetical order. Winners listed first and emphasized in bold. The list of nominees except Best Artist, Best Album, Best Song and Best Performance was announced on December 13, 2022, through the Hanteo News website. Voting opened (except for WhosFandom) on Whosfan mobile application on December 13, 2022, and closed on January 26, 2023. The list of nominees for WhosFandom Award was announced through Twitter on December 14, 2023.

Main Awards

Global Artist Awards

Special Awards 
{| class="wikitable" style="width:80%"
|-
! scope="col" style="background:#EEDD82; width:26%" | Ballad
! scope="col" style="background:#EEDD82; width:27%" | Hip-hop
! scope="col" style="background:#EEDD82; width:26%" | Trot
|-
| style="vertical-align:top" |
 Lee Seok-hoon
 Younha
| style="vertical-align:top" |
 Be'O
| style="vertical-align:top" |
 Kim Ho-joong|}

 Trend Awards 

 Other awards 

 Presenters 
The list of presenters was announced on January 27, 2023.Day 1Day 2 Performers 
The lineup was announced on January 30, 2023.Day 1Day 2'''

References

External links 

2023 in South Korean music
2023 music awards